Messelastur is a genus of messelasturid bird. It is known from the Messel pit of Germany, which dates to the Eocene.

References

Prehistoric bird genera
Eocene birds
Prehistoric birds of Europe
Fossil taxa described in 1994